M8 motorway may refer to:

 M8 Motorway (Sydney), a motorway in Sydney, Australia
Western Highway (Victoria), a motorway in Victoria, Australia
M8 motorway (Hungary), a motorway in Hungary
M8 motorway (Ireland), a motorway in Ireland
M8 highway (Russia), a highway in Russia
M8 motorway (Pakistan), a motorway in Pakistan
M8 motorway (Scotland), a motorway in Scotland